Alessandro Plizzari (born 12 March 2000) is an Italian footballer who plays as a goalkeeper for  club Pescara.

Club career

AC Milan 
Plizzari is a product of AC Milan's youth academy. In July 2016, he was promoted to the first team as a backup goalkeeper and received his first-ever call up to the senior team ahead of a home Serie A game against Udinese played on 11 September 2016, remaining on the bench as an unused substitute. Despite his involvement with the first team, he continued to play for the Primavera (under-19) as a starting goalkeeper throughout the season. In late 2016, Milan rejected a €2 million bid for Plizzari from Manchester City.

Loan to Ternana 
On 4 July 2017, Plizzarri signed a contract extension with Milan until 2020 and was immediately sent on loan to Ternana in Serie B until 30 June 2018. He made his professional debut at 17 years old, on 26 August 2017, in the league match against Empoli. He finished his debut season with 20 appearances in all competitions, conceding a total of 40 goals and keeping one clean sheet.

Return to Milan 
In April 2019, despite making no appearances in the 2018–19 season, Plizzari extended his contract with Milan until the end of June 2023.

Loan to Livorno 
On 1 August 2019, he was loaned out to Serie B club Livorno. He made his debut with Livorno on 5 October, playing as a starter in the league match against Chievo.

Loan to Reggina 
On 21 August 2020, he joined Reggina on loan.

Second return to Milan 
Upon his return from the Reggina loan, he did not appear for Milan in the first half of the 2021–22 season, mostly recovering from a knee surgery.

Loan to Lecce 
On 29 January 2022, he moved on loan to Lecce.

Pescara 
On 26 July 2022, Plizzari joined Serie C club Pescara after few years in Milan.

International career
He was the first-choice goalkeeper for the Italy U17 squad at the 2016 UEFA European Under-17 Championship, where Italy was eliminated at the group stage.

He was on the roster for Italy U20 team at the 2017 FIFA U-20 World Cup, where he was the second-choice goalkeeper behind Andrea Zaccagno. He played once at the tournament, in the third-place game, in which Italy beat Uruguay in a penalty shootout after Plizzari saved two penalties by Uruguay players Rodrigo Amaral and Juan Manuel Boselli.

He was the starting goalkeeper for Italy U19 at the 2018 UEFA European Under-19 Championship, as Italy finished runners-up to Portugal.

The following year he took part in the 2019 FIFA U-20 World Cup with the Italy U20 squad, reaching the fourth place.

He made his debut with the Italy U21 on 10 September 2019, in the 2021 UEFA Euro 2021 qualifying match won 5–0 against Luxembourg.

Career statistics

Club

Honours
Italy U19
UEFA European Under-19 Championship runner-up: 2018

Italy U20
FIFA U-20 World Cup third place: 2017
FIFA U-20 World Cup fourth place: 2019

References

2000 births
People from Crema, Lombardy
Living people
Italian footballers
Italy youth international footballers
Italy under-21 international footballers
A.C. Milan players
Ternana Calcio players
U.S. Livorno 1915 players
Reggina 1914 players
U.S. Lecce players
Delfino Pescara 1936 players
Serie B players
Association football goalkeepers
Sportspeople from the Province of Cremona
Footballers from Lombardy